Monte Pennino is a mountain in the Appennino Umbro-Marchigiano range in Italy. The mountain is on the border between the province of Macerata in the Marche region of Italy and the province of Perugia in the Umbria region of Italy.

References

Mountains of Marche
Mountains of Umbria
Mountains of the Apennines